Rettenegg is a municipality in the district of Weiz in the Austrian state of Styria.

Geography
Rettenegg lies in the Fischbach Alps at the confluence of the Pfaffenbach and the Feistritz.

References

Cities and towns in Weiz District
Fischbach Alps